Foadam Dapaong is a Togolese football club based in Dapaong. They play in the two division in Togolese football, the Togolese Championnat League 2.

Football clubs in Togo